The Ster van Zwolle is a single-day bicycle road race held annually in Zwolle, in the Dutch region of Overijssel. Since 2011, it is organized as a 1.2 event on the UCI Europe Tour.

Winners

References

External links
  

UCI Europe Tour races
Cycle races in the Netherlands
Recurring sporting events established in 1961
1961 establishments in the Netherlands